North Carolina Military Institute was established in 1858. Daniel Harvey Hill was  made superintendent of the school in 1859 and James H. Lane taught natural philosophy (physics) at the Institute until the start of the U.S. Civil War. The school was later used by Charlotte Military Academy, which architect Herbert B. Hunter (1890-1976) attended.  The school building stood at East Morehead and South Boulevard in Charlotte, North Carolina.

North Carolina Military Institute was established by Charlotte businessmen and Dr. Charles J. Fox. By April 1861 it had 150 students. During the start of the U.S. Civil War Governor John Willis Ellis ordered cadets from the school to Raleigh to serve as drill masters. The school closed during the war and the buildings were used as a Confederate hospital for part of it. Daniel Harvey Hill, who trained at West Point was superintendent of the school at the start of the war and was elected colonel of the 1st North Carolina Volunteers. Charles C. Lee was also teaching at the school at the start of the war. He became a lieutenant colonel of the 1st North Carolina Volunteers and then colonel after Hill's promotion. He also served as colonel of the 37th North Carolina Troops and was killed at Frayser's Farm. He is interred in Charlotte. James H. Lane, who graduated from VMI, was also teaching at the North Carolina Military Institute. He was elected major and then lieutenant colonel of the 1st North Carolina Volunteers before being elected colonel of the 28th North Carolina Troops.

According to an article in the Charlotte Observer from 1889:

"As at first organized, the session lasted, without intermission, throughout the year, the months of August and September being spent campaigning in the mountains of North Carolina. At the end of the second year cadets received a furlough of months.

There were a scientific and a primary department. In the former the West Point curriculum was closely followed, and the students were required to board in the buildings and to be under military discipline.

There was a primary department, which aimed to prepare students for any college. Such of these students as boarded in the buildings were likewise under military discipline.
The institute provide board, lodging, fuel, lights, washing, arms, equipment, medical attendance, uniforms and all clothing, except underclothes, for $200 per annum. No extra charges." A Charlotte Observer article from 1915 stated that the "first Confederate flag raised in the city was hoisted there when Fort Sumter fell by the students of the North Carolina Institute."

After the war discussion of reopening the Military School took place but the building was used as a girls' school and from 1873 until 1882 for the Charlotte Military Academy. Later, it was used by the Charlotte Public School system before being  torn down in 1954.

See also
 List of defunct military academies in the United States
 North Carolina Military Academy/ North Carolina Military and Polytechnic Academy /Hillsborough Military Academy

References

Further reading
Remarks of Major D. H. Hill of the N.C. Military Institute at Charlotte, before the Committee on Education of the North Carolina Legislature. [North Carolina: n. p., 1860?]. 1 sheet ([1] p.) ; 49 x 30 cm. OCLC 41374540

Defunct United States military academies
Defunct private universities and colleges in North Carolina
Demolished buildings and structures in North Carolina
Buildings and structures demolished in 1954